The 1984 FIS Freestyle Skiing World Cup was the fifth World Cup season in freestyle skiing organised by International Ski Federation. The season started on 13 January 1984 and ended on 29 March 1984. This season included four disciplines: aerials, moguls, ballet and combined.

Men

Moguls

Aerials

Ballet

Combined

Ladies

Moguls

Aerials

Ballet

Combined

Men's standings

Overall 

Standings after 34 races.

Moguls 

Standings after 9 races.

Aerials 

Standings after 9 races.

Ballet 

Standings after 8 races.

Combined 

Standings after 8 races.

Ladies' standings

Overall 

Standings after 34 races.

Moguls 

Standings after 9 races.

Aerials 

Standings after 9 races.

Ballet 

Standings after 8 races.

Combined 

Standings after 8 races.

References

FIS Freestyle Skiing World Cup
World Cup